Gianluca Naso (born 6 January 1987) is an Italian retired professional tennis player. He won three doubles titles on ATP Challenger Tour in Genoa and Todi (both in 2008). Both times his partner was Walter Trusendi. And in 2013 at Meknes with Alessandro Giannessi.

Challenger finals

Singles: 3 (1–2)

Doubles: 8 (3–5)

References

External links
 
 

Italian male tennis players
Living people
1987 births

Mediterranean Games gold medalists for Italy
Mediterranean Games bronze medalists for Italy
Competitors at the 2009 Mediterranean Games
Mediterranean Games medalists in tennis
20th-century Italian people
21st-century Italian people